Indianapolis was a New Zealand bred Standardbred racehorse. He is notable in that he won three New Zealand Trotting Cup races, the richest harness race, and sometimes the richest horse race in New Zealand. Indianapolis is one of three horses to win the NZ Trotting Cup three times, the others being False Step and Terror to Love.  He held the world record for a three-year-old, a record which stood for 14 years.

He was a brother to Tondeleyo (a notable taproot dam) and Miraculous (contested two Inter Dominion heats, sire) and was a half-brother to the sire, Red Raider.

He won the following major races:
 1932 Great Northern Derby 
 1933 Auckland Pacing Cup
 1934 New Zealand Trotting Cup 
 1935 New Zealand Trotting Cup (handicapped 48 yards)
 1936 New Zealand Trotting Cup (handicapped 48 yards)

See also
 Harness racing in New Zealand

Reference list

External links
 Indianapolis in the 1934 NZ Cup 
 Indianapolis in the 1935 NZ Cup 
 Indianapolis in the 1936 NZ Cup

New Zealand standardbred racehorses
Harness racing in New Zealand
New Zealand Trotting Cup winners
Auckland Pacing Cup winners
1929 racehorse births